Swamps of Huanchaco, also known as Wetlands of Huanchaco is an ecological Chimu reserve located in Huanchaco Beach, about 14 km northwest of Trujillo city, Peru. From this ecological reserve the ancient mochica extracted the raw material for the manufacture of the ancient Caballitos de totora used since the time of the Moche for fishing. Currently Huanchaco fishermen still use their materials from this swamps to make their ships of work.

Tourist and ecological park

Huanchaco Totorales
The ancient mochicas developed formidable cultivation techniques in the arid coastline of northern Peru. One is planting  ('dug wells') to find the water near the sea. The brackish waters were able to adapt the totora (Scirpus californicus). The Huanchaco fishermen were shown as eminent navigators, making long trips overseas in their reed boats.

See also
Huanchaco
Moche
Chimu
Víctor Larco Herrera District
Vista Alegre
Buenos Aires
Las Delicias

External links
Location of the wetlands of Huanchaco (Wikimapia)

References

Protected areas of Peru
Geography of Trujillo, Peru